The Asa and Sylvester Abbot House is a historic two-family house at 15–17 Porter Road in Andover, Massachusetts. Built in the 1830s, it is a rare local example of the duplex in a rural setting. It was listed on the National Register of Historic Places in 1982, where it is incorrectly listed at 15–17 Andover Street.

Description and history
The Asa and Sylvester Abbot House stands in what is now a residential area, south of downtown Andover and the Phillips Academy campus, on the northwest side of Porter Road, just north of its junction with Karlton Circle. It is a -story wood-frame structure, with a side-gable roof, two central chimneys (one on each side of the roof ridge), and a clapboarded exterior. The front facade is symmetrical and six bays across, with entrances in the outer bays. Each entrance is recessed with sidelight windows, and the recess is framed by pilasters, entablature, and gabled pediment. Period single-story ells extend to either side, with later additions further extending the house in both directions.

The house was built in the 1830s by Asa Abbot, a farmer and member of the locally prominent Abbot family. He left the house to his sons, Sylvester and Asa Albert Abbot, who farmed the surrounding land until the turn of the 20th century. The house is a good local example of Greek Revival architecture, and is particularly rare as a duplex in a setting that was rural at the time of its construction.

See also
National Register of Historic Places listings in Andover, Massachusetts
National Register of Historic Places listings in Essex County, Massachusetts

References

Houses completed in 1830
Houses in Andover, Massachusetts
National Register of Historic Places in Andover, Massachusetts
1830 establishments in Massachusetts
Houses on the National Register of Historic Places in Essex County, Massachusetts
Greek Revival houses in Massachusetts